Marine energy or marine power (also sometimes referred to as ocean energy, ocean power, or marine and hydrokinetic energy) refers to the energy carried by ocean waves, tides, salinity, and ocean temperature differences. The movement of water in the world's oceans creates a vast store of kinetic energy, or energy in motion. Some of this energy can be harnessed to generate electricity to power homes, transport and industries.

The term marine energy encompasses both wave power i.e. power from surface waves, and tidal power i.e. obtained from the kinetic energy of large bodies of moving water. Offshore wind power is not a form of marine energy, as wind power is derived from the wind, even if the wind turbines are placed over water.

The oceans have a tremendous amount of energy and are close to many if not most concentrated populations. Ocean energy has the potential of providing a substantial amount of new renewable energy around the world.

Global potential 

There is the potential to develop 20,000–80,000 terawatt-hours per year (TWh/y) of electricity generated by changes in ocean temperatures, salt content, movements of tides, currents, waves and swells

Indonesia, as an archipelagic country that is three quarters ocean, has 49 GW recognized potential ocean energy and has 727 GW theoretical potential ocean energy.

Forms of ocean energy 

The oceans represent a vast and largely untapped source of energy in the form of surface waves, fluid flow, salinity gradients, and thermal differences.

Marine and Hydrokinetic (MHK) or marine energy development in U.S. and international waters includes projects using the following devices:

 Wave power converters in open coastal areas with significant waves;
 Tidal turbines placed in coastal and estuarine areas;
 In-stream turbines in fast-moving rivers;
 Ocean current turbines in areas of strong marine currents;
 Ocean thermal energy converters in deep tropical waters.

Marine current power 

Strong ocean currents are generated from a combination of temperature, wind, salinity, bathymetry, and the rotation of the Earth. The Sun acts as the primary driving force, causing winds and temperature differences. Because there are only small fluctuations in current speed and stream location with no changes in direction, ocean currents may be suitable locations for deploying energy extraction devices such as turbines.

Ocean currents are instrumental in determining the climate in many regions around the world. While little is known about the effects of removing ocean current energy, the impacts of removing current energy on the farfield environment may be a significant environmental concern. The typical turbine issues with blade strike, entanglement of marine organisms, and acoustic effects still exists; however, these may be magnified due to the presence of more diverse populations of marine organisms using ocean currents for migration purposes. Locations can be further offshore and therefore require longer power cables that could affect the marine environment with electromagnetic output.

Osmotic power 

At the mouth of rivers where fresh water mixes with salt water, energy associated with the salinity gradient can be harnessed using pressure-retarded reverse osmosis process and associated conversion technologies. Another system is based on using freshwater upwelling through a turbine immersed in seawater, and one involving electrochemical reactions is also in development.

Significant research took place from 1975 to 1985 and gave various results regarding the economy of PRO and RED plants. It is important to note that small-scale investigations into salinity power production take place in other countries like Japan, Israel, and the United States. In Europe the research is concentrated in Norway and the Netherlands, in both places small pilots are tested. Salinity gradient energy is the energy available from the difference in salt concentration between freshwater with saltwater. This energy source is not easy to understand, as it is not directly occurring in nature in the form of heat, waterfalls, wind, waves, or radiation.

Ocean thermal energy 

Water typically varies in temperature from the surface warmed by direct sunlight to greater depths where sunlight cannot penetrate. This differential is greatest in tropical waters, making this technology most applicable in water locations. A fluid is often vaporized to drive a turbine that may generate electricity or produce desalinized water. Systems may be either open-cycle, closed-cycle, or hybrid.

Tidal power 

The energy from moving masses of water – a popular form of hydroelectric power generation. Tidal power generation comprises three main forms, namely tidal stream power, tidal barrage power, and dynamic tidal power.

Wave power 

Solar energy from the Sun creates temperature differentials that result in wind. The interaction between wind and the surface of water creates waves, which are larger when there is a greater distance for them to build up. Wave energy potential is greatest between 30° and 60° latitude in both hemispheres on the west coast because of the global direction of wind. When evaluating wave energy as a technology type, it is important to distinguish between the four most common approaches: point absorber buoys, surface attenuators, oscillating water columns, and overtopping devices.

The wave energy sector is reaching a significant milestone in the development of the industry, with positive steps towards commercial viability being taken. The more advanced device developers are now progressing beyond single unit demonstration devices and are proceeding to array development and multi-megawatt projects. The backing of major utility companies is now manifesting itself through partnerships within the development process, unlocking further investment and, in some cases, international co-operation.

At a simplified level, wave energy technology can be located near-shore and offshore. Wave energy converters can also be designed for operation in specific water depth conditions: deep water, intermediate water or shallow water. The fundamental device design will be dependent on the location of the device and the intended resource characteristics.

Marine energy development

The UK is leading the way in wave and tidal (marine) power generation. The world's first marine energy test facility was established in 2003 to kick start the development of the marine energy industry in the UK. Based in Orkney, Scotland, the European Marine Energy Centre (EMEC) has supported the deployment of more wave and tidal energy devices than at any other single site in the world. The centre was established with around £36 million of funding from the Scottish Government, Highlands and Islands Enterprise, the Carbon Trust, UK Government, Scottish Enterprise, the European Union and Orkney Islands Council, and is the only accredited wave and tidal test centre for marine renewable energy in the world, suitable for testing a number of full-scale devices simultaneously in some of the harshest weather conditions while producing electricity to the national grid.

Clients that have tested at the centre include Aquamarine Power, AW Energy, Pelamis Wave Power, Seatricity, ScottishPower Renewables and Wello on the wave site, and Alstom (formerly Tidal Generation Ltd), ANDRITZ HYDRO Hammerfest, Kawasaki Heavy Industries, Magallanes, Nautricity, Open Hydro, Scotrenewables Tidal Power, and Voith on the tidal site.

Leading the €11m FORESEA (Funding Ocean Renewable Energy through Strategic European Action) project, which provides funding support to ocean energy technology developers to access Europe's world-leading ocean energy test facilities, EMEC will welcome a number of wave and tidal clients to their pipeline for testing on site.

Beyond device testing, EMEC also provides a wide range of consultancy and research services, and is working closely with Marine Scotland to streamline the consenting process for marine energy developers. EMEC is at the forefront in the development of international standards for marine energy, and is forging alliances with other countries, exporting its knowledge around the world to stimulate the development of a global marine renewables industry.

Environmental effects

Common environmental concerns associated with marine energy developments include:

 the risk of marine mammals and fish being struck by tidal turbine blades
 the effects of EMF and underwater noise emitted from operating marine energy devices
 the physical presence of marine energy projects and their potential to alter the behavior of marine mammals, fish, and seabirds with attraction or avoidance
 the potential effect on nearfield and farfield marine environment and processes such as sediment transport and water quality

The Tethys database provides access to scientific literature and general information on the potential environmental effects of marine energy.

See also 

 Energy harvesting
 Hydropower
 Marine current power
 Renewable energy
 Renewable energy commercialization

References

Further reading 
 Omar Ellabban, Haitham Abu-Rub, Frede Blaabjerg: Renewable energy resources: Current status, future prospects and their enabling technology. Renewable and Sustainable Energy Reviews 39, (2014), 748–764, .

External links 

 The Ocean Energy Systems Implementing Agreement
 European Ocean Energy Association
 The European Marine Energy Centre (EMEC)
 Ocean Energy Council
 SuperGen UK Centre for Marine Energy Research
 Marine Energy Times, information website
 Tethys - Environmental Effects of Wind and Marine Renewable Energy

 
Water power
Oceanographical terminology